Luminate Education Group (formerly Leeds City College Group) brings together a number of secondary, further and higher education institutions in Yorkshire, England. It was renamed from Leeds City College Group in December 2018 to better reflect its growing portfolio of institutions.

Organisation

The members of the group are:
Leeds City College, formed from the merger in 2009 of Park Lane College Leeds, Leeds College of Technology and Leeds Thomas Danby College along with Joseph Priestley College (which joined in 2011).
Keighley College
Leeds College of Music, now Leeds Conservatoire
White Rose Academies Trust, which operates Leeds City Academy, Leeds East Academy, Leeds West Academy and (from 1 December 2020), Alder Tree Primary, formerly Mill Field Primary Academy.
Harrogate College, which joined the Group on 1 August 2019.

The group currently has around 22,300 students.

Higher education provision in Leeds is delivered under the name "University Centre Leeds". The business and staff development teams of the Leeds, Keighley and Harrogate Colleges were brought together on 18 January 2021 to form the Yorkshire Centre for Training and Development.

References

External links
 Luminate Education Group

Education companies of the United Kingdom
Education in Yorkshire